Michiko Shimizu may refer to:
 Michiko Shimizu (athlete)
 Michiko Shimizu (entertainer)